Pseudodavara haemaphoralis is a moth of the family Pyralidae first described by George Hampson in 1908. It is found in India and Sri Lanka.

References

Moths of Asia
Moths described in 1908
Phycitini